Robert Glenmore Simmons (December 25, 1891 – December 27, 1969) was a Nebraska Republican politician.

Simmons was born on December 25, 1891, near Scottsbluff, Nebraska. He attended Hastings College from 1909 to 1911 and the University of Nebraska–Lincoln in 1915. He was admitted to the bar in 1915 and set up practice in Gering, Nebraska. He was elected prosecuting attorney of Scotts Bluff County in 1916. During the first World War, on October 15, 1917, he enlisted in the army. He was commissioned as a second lieutenant in the Air Service on March 12, 1918, and was discharged on January 14, 1919.

Simmons was elected as a Republican to the 68th through 72nd Congresses (March 4, 1923 – March 3, 1933) to represent Nebraska's 6th district. When Nebraska lost a district, he ran and lost in the preceding new district in 1932. He ran for the United States Senate in 1934 against Edward R. Burke and in 1936 against George W. Norris, losing both times. He resumed practicing law in Lincoln, Nebraska.

Simmons was elected chief justice of the Supreme Court of Nebraska in 1938. He was also a deputy judge in the administrative tribunal of the International Labour Organization in Geneva, Switzerland, in 1955. While serving as Chief Justice, along with the chief justices of New Jersey, Arthur T. Vanderbilt, and Missouri, Laurance M. Hyde, he co-founded the Conference of Chief Justices in 1949.  He retired in January 1963 after twenty-four years as the chief justice of Nebraska.

He returned to private law in Lincoln, Nebraska. He died in Lincoln on December 27, 1969, and is interred in Fairview Cemetery, Scottsbluff.

He was a  Congregationalist, a member of the American Bar Association, a member of the Order of the Coif, a member of the American Legion, a Freemason and a Shriner.

References
 
 
 
 
 http://ccj.ncsc.dni.us

United States Army Air Service pilots of World War I
Chief Justices of the Nebraska Supreme Court
Nebraska lawyers
Hastings College alumni
University of Nebraska–Lincoln alumni
American Congregationalists
United States Army soldiers
1891 births
1969 deaths
Republican Party members of the United States House of Representatives from Nebraska
20th-century American judges
People from Scottsbluff, Nebraska
People from Gering, Nebraska
20th-century American politicians
20th-century American lawyers